Frederick Arthur Challinor (12 November 1866 at Longton, Staffordshire – 10 June 1952 at Paignton, Devon), was a British composer.

His father was a miner.  Challinor was ten when he started labouring in a brickworks.  At age twelve he was working in a coal-mine. At fifteen he went to work in a pottery.  At this time a legacy to the family included a cottage piano and this inspired an interest in music.  He worked at lessons on harmony while taking his meals at the factory.

Studies resulted in him becoming an Associate of the Royal College of Music.  He then started study toward a Bachelor of Music degree.  He graduated with distinction in 1897 and became a successful composer.  Cantatas such as Judah in Babylon, The Gardens of the Lord, and Bethany were well received.  His music is attractive partly because of its simplicity and expressive qualities but also for its originality and directness.

In 1903 he became a Doctor of Music.  At the time he had some four hundred published compositions.  He also wrote the words for many songs.

He might be remembered for the lilting hymn tune Stories of Jesus (words by William H Parker) written for a competition sponsored by the National Sunday-school Union, London.

References 

 Lightwood, James T., The Music of the Methodist Church, The Epworth Press, 1935, 1955 (revised)

1866 births
1952 deaths
People from Longton, Staffordshire
English composers